Heather Mary Dewdney (born 17 February 1947) is an English former cricketer. She appeared in 1 Test match and 6 One Day Internationals for England between 1969 and 1978. She played domestic cricket for Kent.

References

External links
 

1947 births
Living people
People from Bromley
England women Test cricketers
England women One Day International cricketers
Kent women cricketers